Aldisa williamsi is a species of sea slug, a dorid nudibranch, a marine gastropod mollusk in the family Cadlinidae.

Distribution 
This species was described from Barracuda Point in  Papua New Guinea. It has subsequently been found in Sulawesi, Flores, Rinca Is. and Pantar Is., in Indonesia.

References

Cadlinidae
Gastropods described in 2000